The Web ARChive (WARC) archive format specifies a method for combining multiple digital resources into an aggregate archive file together with related information. The WARC format is a revision of the Internet Archive's ARC_IA File Format that has traditionally been used to store "web crawls" as sequences of content blocks harvested from the World Wide Web. The WARC format generalizes the older format to better support the harvesting, access, and exchange needs of archiving organizations. Besides the primary content currently recorded, the revision accommodates related secondary content, such as assigned metadata, abbreviated duplicate detection events, and later-date transformations. The WARC format is inspired by HTTP/1.0 streams, with a similar header and the use of CRLFs as delimiters, making it very conducive to crawler implementations.

First specified in 2008, WARC is now recognised by most national library systems as the standard to follow for web archiving.

Software 

  Heritrix web archiver in Java
 wget 1.x (since version 1.14)
 Webrecorder
 StormCrawler
 Apache Nutch
 libarchive

References

External links

 WARC File Format specifications
 The WARC File Format (ISO 28500) - Information, Maintenance, Drafts
 WARC, Web ARChive file format
 WARC implementation guidelines
 Welcome
 13. Internet Archive ARC files

Archive formats
Web archiving
Web Archives